Jan (or John) van Virneburg (died 23 June 1371) was a bishop of Münster from 1363 to 1364, and bishop of Utrecht from 1364 to 1371.

Jan van Virneburg was transferred from Münster to Utrecht by pope Urban V after the transfer of bishop Jan van Arkel from Utrecht to Liege. His rule was not a success. Already during the vacancy before his consecration, the chapters and the city of Utrecht united to codify their rights in the so-called Overdrachte. Because of this, Jan was a weak leader, forced to follow the politics of the states. He did not succeed in continuing the strong rule his predecessor had had. During the war against Albert I, Count of Holland he suffered multiple defeats, and he was captured during an expedition to Twente. In order to pay his ransom he was forced to lease the Oversticht and Vollenhove.

Prince-Bishops of Utrecht
1371 deaths
14th-century Roman Catholic bishops in the Holy Roman Empire
John 01
Year of birth unknown
Cathedral deans of Cologne